The 1982 Boise State Broncos football team represented Boise State University in the 1982 NCAA Division I-AA football season. The Broncos competed in the Big Sky Conference and played their home games on campus at Bronco Stadium in Boise, Idaho.

Entering the rivalry game with Idaho at Bronco Stadium on October 30, Boise State had a five–game winning streak over the Vandals.  and the Broncos did not defeat the Vandals for over a decade, until 1994.

Schedule

Roster

NFL Draft
Two Bronco seniors were selected in the 1983 NFL Draft, which lasted twelve rounds (335 selections).

References

External links
 Bronco Football Stats – 1982

Boise State
Boise State Broncos football seasons
Boise State Broncos football